Dubuque County is a county located in the U.S. state of Iowa. As of the 2020 census, the population was 99,266, making it the eighth-most populous county in Iowa. The county seat is Dubuque. The county is named for Julien Dubuque, the first European settler of Iowa.

Dubuque County comprises the Dubuque, IA Metropolitan Statistical Area.

History

Early history
Dubuque County is named for French trader Julien Dubuque, the first European settler of Iowa, and an early lead mining pioneer in what is now Dubuque County. Dubuque was French Canadian, and had (by most accounts) a friendly relationship with the local Fox tribe of Native Americans. He and other early pioneers established a lucrative mining and trading industry in the area. When lead deposits began becoming exhausted, the pioneers developed boat building, lumber yards, milling, brewing, and machinery manufacturing to take its place.

The city of Dubuque was chartered in 1833 as the first city in Iowa. The establishment of the City of Dubuque in 1833 led to large-scale settlement of the surrounding area. This was greatly encouraged by the Roman Catholic Church, which sent priests, bishops, and nuns to establish churches in the unpopulated countryside. Primarily, Irish and German (many of whom were Catholic) immigrants came to the region.

At an extra session of the Sixth Legislative Assembly of Michigan Territory held in September, 1834, the Iowa District was divided into two counties by running a line due west from the lower end of Rock Island in the Mississippi River. The territory north of this line (which started just south of the present-day Davenport) was named Dubuque County, and all south of it was Demoine County [sic]. Thus, at that time Dubuque County nominally included not only much of what is now the state of Minnesota but portions of what are now North Dakota and South Dakota.

Dubuque County became part of Wisconsin Territory once it was split off from Michigan Territory on July 3, 1836. A massive reorganization and reduction of the county's size was executed on December 21, 1837, when its original area was separated into 13 named new counties and a "non-county area". The land in present day Minnesota and the Dakotas was transferred to the newly created Fayette County in this action. Dubuque County became a part of Iowa Territory upon its creation on July 4, 1838.

In 1858, Saint Francis Catholic Church was established in Dubuque County.

Middle history
In the 1980s, the farm crisis set in, and devastated large sections of the Midwest, including Dubuque County. Since the area was heavily dependent on agriculture-related industries like Deere and Company and the Dubuque Packing Company, unemployment soared. In one month of 1982, Dubuque County had 23% unemployment, the highest in the nation. The county experienced huge population losses during this time, as workers left the area. It would not fully recover from this until the late 1990s, when the economy diversified, shifting away from manufacturing, and toward various service-related establishments.

Modern history

Since the 1990s, the area has become much more prosperous. Today, the county boasts record employment levels and a growing population. The surging economy can especially be seen in the West Side of the City of Dubuque, and in neighboring Peosta and Asbury. These areas have expanded so much that concerns now lie with trying to manage the growth, a sharp change from just 20 years ago.

It is one of Iowa's two original counties along with Des Moines County; both were organized by the Michigan Territorial legislature in 1834.

In 2021, the Dubuque County Minutemen baseball team advanced to the American Legion World Series semi-finals, the first team from Iowa to advance that far since Cedar Rapids, IA in 1975.

Government
Dubuque County is governed by a three-member Board of Supervisors elected at large. Current supervisors include Ann McDonough, Wayne Kenniker and Harley Pothoff (chairperson). They meet weekly on Monday at 9:00 a.m. and the last Monday of the month at 5:30 p.m. in the Dubuque County Courthouse.

The current county attorney is Scott Nelson, who succeeded C.J. May in 2023.

The current county auditor is Kevin Dragotto, who succeeded Denise Dolan in 2021.

The current county treasurer is Michael Clasen, who succeeded Eric Steirman in 2022

Law enforcement

The county sheriff's office provides law enforcement services for unincorporated areas of Dubuque County, as well as providing courthouse security, operating the county jail, and performing civil procedures. The Sheriff's Department is located at the Dubuque City/County Law Enforcement Center. The department shares facilities and other resources with the Dubuque Police Department.

Geography

Geographic features
The county borders on Illinois and Wisconsin, and is bounded on the northeast by the Mississippi River. The county is drained by north and south forks of the Maquoketa River.

The county seat is Dubuque, Iowa, which is located along the Mississippi River in the east-central portion of the county. Eastern Dubuque County is markedly different from the western portion in that its topography is very uneven. The city of Dubuque and surrounding areas adjacent to the Mississippi River have many steep hills, bluffs, and ravines. Also, the eastern portion is more heavily wooded than the west, which is mostly rolling farmland.

Dubuque County is widely known for its impressive bluffs along the Mississippi River, which run along the entire length of the county's riverbanks. These form part of Iowa's Coulee Region, otherwise known as the Driftless Area. During the last ice age, much of the Mississippi Valley near Dubuque County was bypassed by glacial flows, which flattened the surrounding land in eastern Illinois, Wisconsin, and western Iowa, leaving the Driftless Area unusually rugged.

Major parks
The Iowa Department of Natural Resources administers 3 park and preserve areas in the county:
Little Maquoketa River Mounds State Preserve
Mines of Spain State Recreation Area/E. B. Lyons Nature Center
White Pine Hollow State Forest
The Dubuque County Conservation Board administers 11 park and recreation areas in the county:

Bankston Park
Fillmore Recreation Area & Fairways
Finley's Landing Park
Heritage Trail & Pond
Interstate Power Forest Preserve
Massey Marina Park
Mud Lake Park
New Wine Park
Pohlman Prairie Preserve
Swiss Valley Nature Park & Preserve
Whitewater Canyon Park

The City of Dubuque and other towns in the county also operate public park systems of their own. (see Parks in Dubuque, Iowa)

Major highways

 U.S. Highway 20
 U.S. Highway 52
 U.S. Highway 61
 U.S. Highway 151
 Iowa Highway 3
 Iowa Highway 32
 Iowa Highway 136

Transit
 The Jule
 List of intercity bus stops in Iowa

Adjacent counties
Clayton County  (north)
Grant County, Wisconsin  (northeast)
Jo Daviess County, Illinois  (east)
Jackson County  (southeast)
Jones County  (southwest)
Delaware County  (west)

National protected areas
 Driftless Area National Wildlife Refuge (part)
 Upper Mississippi River National Wildlife and Fish Refuge (part)

Demographics

2020 census
There were 42,630 housing units of which 39,891 were occupied.

2010 census
There were 38,951 housing units, of which 36,815 were occupied.

2000 census

At the 2000 census, there were 89,143 people, 33,690 households and 23,111 families residing in the county. The population density was 147 per square mile (57/km2). There were 35,505 housing units at an average density of 58 per square mile (23/km2).  The racial makeup of the county was 97.07% White, 0.86% Black or African American, 0.15% Native American, 0.58% Asian, 0.09% Pacific Islander, 0.50% from other races, and 0.76% from two or more races.  1.19% of the population were Hispanic or Latino of any race.

2005 estimates by the census indicated that Dubuque had a population that identified itself as being 95.5% non-Hispanic white, 1.3% African American, 0.7% Asian and 1.5% Latino.

There were 33,690 households, of which 33.10% had children under the age of 18 living with them, 56.80% were married couples living together, 8.70% had a female householder with no husband present, and 31.40% were non-families. 26.70% of all households were made up of individuals, and 10.80% had someone living alone who was 65 years of age or older.  The average household size was 2.51 and the average family size was 3.07.

25.60% of the population were under the age of 18, 10.20% from 18 to 24, 27.20% from 25 to 44, 22.30% from 45 to 64, and 14.70% who were 65 years of age or older. The median age was 36 years. For every 100 females there were 94.40 males. For every 100 females age 18 and over, there were 91.30 males.

The median household income was $39,582 and the median family income was $48,742. Males had a median income of $31,977 versus $22,309 for females. The per capita income for the county was $19,600. About 4.90% of families and 7.80% of the population were below the poverty line, including 7.80% of those under age 18 and 11.00% of those age 65 or over.

Economy

Historically, Dubuque County's economy was driven by heavy industry, including, among others, Deere and Company, and the now-defunct Dubuque Packing Company. However, within the last 20 years, and especially within the last 10 years, the economy has diversified a great deal. Now, alongside manufacturing, which still employs thousands of workers, many county residents work in the tourism/gaming, health care, education, publishing, and financial service sectors.

The county's economy is largely centered around business and industry within the City of Dubuque. With the exception of industrial areas in Cascade, Dyersville, and Peosta, almost all of the rest of the county is rural and agriculturally driven. Some of the key industries in Dubuque County include: Deere and Company, Eagle Window & Door Co., Flexsteel Industries, Mi-T-M Corp., A.Y. McDonald Mfg. Co., Klauer Mfg., Georgia-Pacific, and Swiss Valley Farms, among others. Besides industry, large numbers of people work for the Dubuque Community School District, Mercy Medical Center - Dubuque, Medical Associates, Finley Hospital, Prudential Financial, the City of Dubuque, and Cottingham & Butler.

Growth
Dubuque County has, in recent years, enjoyed job growth, low unemployment, and the rapid expansion of business and commerce. Alongside these positives, the county is beginning to see a growing population, as well. Up from a recent low of 86,403 in 1990, the population is now about 97,000 and growing. This can be seen especially in the West Side of the City of Dubuque, and in nearby Asbury and Peosta. This fact is especially significant, considering that all of the counties surrounding Dubuque County have fewer people now than they did in 1900, with the exception of Grant County, Wisconsin.

Politics
Dubuque County was historically Democratic and supported every Democratic Party Presidential candidate from John F. Kennedy to Barack Obama, with President Obama winning the county by over 20 points in 2008. In 2016, it was narrowly won by Donald Trump, who became the first Republican to win the county since President Eisenhower in 1956. Trump won the county again in 2020, by a larger margin. In the 2022 elections, the county continued to trend rightward, with Republican governor Kim Reynolds winning reelection by a margin of over 16 points. The county additionally voted for Republican Chuck Grassley in U.S. Senate election and for Republican Ashley Hinson in the election for U.S. House of Representatives.

Dubuque County is within Iowa's 1st congressional district, represented by Republican Ashley Hinson.

Education
Capri Cosmetology College
Clarke University
Divine Word College
Emmaus Bible College
Loras College
Northeast Iowa Community College
University of Dubuque
Wartburg Theological Seminary

Communities

Cities

Asbury
Balltown
Bankston
Bernard
Cascade
Centralia
Dubuque
Durango
Dyersville
Epworth
Farley
Graf
Holy Cross
Luxemburg
New Vienna
Peosta
Rickardsville
Sageville
Sherrill
Worthington
Zwingle

Unincorporated communities
Fillmore
Key West
Washington Mills

Townships
Dubuque County is divided into seventeen townships:

 Cascade
 Center
 Concord
 Dodge
 Dubuque
 Iowa
 Jefferson
 Liberty
 Mosalem
 New Wine
 Peru
 Prairie Creek
 Table Mound
 Taylor
 Vernon
 Washington
 Whitewater

Population ranking

See also

List of counties in Iowa
National Register of Historic Places listings in Dubuque County, Iowa

References

External links

Dubuque County Government website

 
1834 establishments in Michigan Territory
Populated places established in 1834
Driftless Area
Iowa counties on the Mississippi River